Tisnaren is a lake of Södermanland, Sweden.

References 

Lakes of Södermanland County